This is a list of members of the 24th Legislative Assembly of Queensland from 1926 to 1929, as elected at the 1926 state election held on 8 May 1926.

  On 2 May 1927, the Labor member for Balonne, Edward Land, died. Labor candidate Samuel Brassington won the resulting by-election on 6 August 1927.
  On 5 December 1927, the CPNP member for Stanley, Frederick Lancelot Nott, died. CPNP candidate Ernest Grimstone won the resulting by-election on 25 February 1928.
  On 24 January 1928, the Labor member for Mitchell, John Payne, died. Labor candidate Richard Bow won the resulting by-election on 26 May 1928.
  On 16 August 1928, the CPNP member for Burnett, Bernard Corser, resigned to run for the federal seat of Wide Bay. CPNP candidate Robert Boyd won the resulting by-election on 13 October 1928.
  On 19 March 1929, the CPNP member for Albert, John Appel, died. The vacancy was not filled due to the imminent 1929 state election.

See also
1926 Queensland state election
McCormack Ministry (Labor) (1925–1929)

References

 Waterson, Duncan Bruce: Biographical Register of the Queensland Parliament 1860-1929 (second edition), Sydney 2001.
 

Members of Queensland parliaments by term
20th-century Australian politicians